Alsény Camara (born 1 June 1996) is a Guinean international footballer who plays for Horoya AC, as a right back.

Career
He has played club football for AS Kaloum Star and Horoya AC.

He made his international debut for Guinea in 2016.

References

1996 births
Living people
Guinean footballers
Guinea international footballers
AS Kaloum Star players
Horoya AC players
Association football fullbacks
Guinée Championnat National players
Guinea A' international footballers
2016 African Nations Championship players
2018 African Nations Championship players